The Tarama language is a Japonic language spoken on the islands of Tarama and nearly depopulated Minna, two of the Miyako Islands of Japan. It is closely related to Miyakoan, but intelligibility is low. It is only spoken by elderly people.

Phonology

Vowels
Tarama has four main vowels, and three marginal vowels  found in a restricted set of words. 

 'person',  'yellow',  'right'

Consonants
Tarama does have voiced stops: 

The 'l' is a retroflex lateral flap, also found in the Irabu language (Jarosz p. 43).  occur as syllable codas, as in pail 'to grow' (Japanese haeru), psks 'to pull' (Japanese hiku). 

The two nasals may be syllabic, as in mm 'potato' and nna 'rope'. 'Onsets' include geminate consonants, as in ssam 'loose' and ffa 'child'. Otherwise, the only consonant clusters are /Cj/, as in kjuu 'today', sjata 'sugar'. Sonorants can end syllables and words, as in kan 'crab', mim 'ear', and tul 'bird'. Vowel sequences include long vowels Vː and the 'diphthongs' Vi, and Vɨ. This structure has been analyzed as a syllable, but initial geminate consonants, long vowels and diphthongs are all bimoraic, and codas are moraic as well, so that e.g. ssam is three moras (. A phonological word must be at least two moras long.

Orthography

References

External links
 Miyako dialect dictionary, Okinawa Center of Language Study
 Aleksandra Jarosz, Nikolay Nevskiy's Miyakoan dictionary (PhD dissertation on Nikolai Nevsky's draft manuscript dictionary of Miyakoan)

Ryukyuan languages
Miyako Islands